This is a list of people sentenced to more than one life imprisonment in a single trial, worldwide. The sentence may specify that the life sentences are to be served concurrently or consecutively.

Prisoners sentenced to more than 10 life sentences

Prisoners sentenced up to 10 life sentences

Prisoners sentenced up to 5 life sentences

Prisoners sentenced up to 3 life sentences

Prisoners sentenced to one life sentence plus additional time

See also
List of longest prison sentences
List of longest prison sentences served

References

Lists of prisoners and detainees
Prisoners sentenced to life imprisonment